Dylan Ryan is an Australian professional footballer who plays as a centre-back for FC Den Bosch.

Club career

Melbourne Victory
Melbourne Victory announced that they had signed Ryan on a one year loan in November 2020. He made his first-team debut on November 24, starting against Beijing Guoan in the 2020 AFC Champions League. In June 2021, it was announced that his loan ended and he returned to Willem II.

References

External links

 Career stats & Profile - Voetbal International

2000 births
Living people
Melbourne Victory FC players
Willem II (football club) players
A-League Men players
Australian soccer players
Australian expatriate soccer players
Expatriate footballers in the Netherlands
Association football defenders